Shoheytat (also Romanized as Shoḩeyţāt; also known as Ro‘ayyed and Ru‘eyd) is a village in Gazin Rural District, Raghiveh District, Haftgel County, Khuzestan Province, Iran. At the 2006 census, its population was 57, in 11 families.

References 

Populated places in Haftkel County